The following is a partial list of notable residents, past and present, from Hillsboro, Oregon, United States. A separate list of people from Oregon is available.

Mayors

Harry T. Bagley
William N. Barrett
Steve Callaway
Benjamin P. Cornelius
Rodolph Crandall
Miller M. Duris
Gordon Faber
Joseph C. Hare
William D. Hare
Shirley Huffman
Tom Hughes
Samuel B. Huston
Thomas H. Tongue
Charles T. Tozier

Athletes

Erik Ainge, football player
Wally Backman, World Series champion with the Mets, baseball player
Bob Beall, baseball player
Scott Brosius, baseball player
Scott Brow, baseball player who won the 1993 World Series with the Toronto Blue Jays
Jim Evenson, football player
Thomas Garrigus, Olympic shooting athlete
Darrall Imhoff, basketball player
Josh Inman, Olympic rower
Scott Kozak, football player
Mitch Meeuwsen, football player
Tiffeny Milbrett, soccer player
Vern Olsen, baseball player
Ben Petrick, baseball player
Roddy Piper, professional wrestler
Clifford R. Robinson, basketball player
Scott Rueck, women's basketball coach
Ad Rutschman, Hall of Fame football coach
Wes Schulmerich, baseball player

Politicians

George R. Bagley, lawyer and judge
Rick Dancer, politician and news anchor
Leon S. Davis, politician
George W. Ebbert, pioneer
David Edwards, politician who served in the Oregon House
Daniel Gault, educator, newspaperman, and state legislator
William G. Hare, politician
H. T. Hesse, politician
David Hill, pioneer and city namesake
Derrick Kitts, politician who served in the Oregon House 
Shawn Lindsay, attorney and politician
George W. Patterson, politician
Paul L. Patterson, former Oregon governor
D. O. Quick, state legislator
Edward Schulmerich, banker and politician
Samuel Thurston, first Congressional delegate from Oregon 
Thomas Tongue, former Oregon Supreme Court justice
William H. Wehrung, politician and businessman
James Withycombe, former Oregon governor

Others

Kelly AuCoin, actor
Cesar Barone, serial killer
Genevieve Bell, anthropologist for Intel
Cecilee Russell Essary, Residents' Interhall Congress advisor at the University of Arkansas
Peggy Y. Fowler, CEO of Portland General Electric
Judi Hofer, businessperson
David Larsen, actor
Savannah Outen, singer
Tommy Overstreet, country music singer
Norman Ralston, aviator
John W. Shute, banker
Albert E. Tozier, journalist
Mary Ramsey Wood, "Mother Queen of Oregon"
Bryce Zabel, writer/producer, former chairman of the Academy of Television Arts & Sciences

See also 
 Lists of Oregon-related topics

References

 
Hillsboro, Oregon
Hillsboro, Portland